Richard Scott (26 October 1941 – 11 February 2018) was an English footballer who played in the Football League for Cardiff City, Lincoln City, Norwich City and Scunthorpe United.

References

External links
 

1941 births
2018 deaths
English footballers
English Football League players
Norwich City F.C. players
Cardiff City F.C. players
Scunthorpe United F.C. players
Lincoln City F.C. players
King's Lynn F.C. players
Association football midfielders
People from Thetford